The Tribe Flood Network or TFN is a set of computer programs to conduct various DDoS attacks such as ICMP flood, SYN flood, UDP flood and Smurf attack. 

First TFN  initiated attacks are described in CERT Incident Note 99-04.

TFN2K was written by Mixter, a security professional and hacker based in Germany.

See also

External links
 Tribe Flood Network
 TFN2K - An Analysis by Jason Barlow and Woody Thrower of AXENT Security Team
 TFN2K source code

Botnets

Denial-of-service attacks